Astrue v. Capato, 566 U.S. 541 (2012), was a case in which the Supreme Court of the United States held that children conceived after a parent's death are not entitled to Social Security Survivors benefits if the laws in the state that the parent's will was signed in forbid it. The case was a unanimous decision.

Background
In 1999, Karen Capato's husband, Robert Capato, was diagnosed with esophageal cancer. Out of fear that he would become sterile due to the chemotherapy, Robert started to deposit sperm in a sperm bank in 2001. He began to recover and discovered that he was not left infertile by the cancer treatments. This led to the Capatos conceiving a son.  Robert's condition started to worsen in 2002 and he died of cancer. Eighteen months after her husband's death, in 2003, Capato gave birth to twins. They were conceived after Robert's death using the sperm deposited in the sperm bank via in vitro fertilization.  This was according to the Capatos' plan, so their son could have siblings. She applied for Social Security Survivors Benefits based on her husband's earnings during his lifetime. Her claim was rejected by the Social Security Administration (SSA).

Litigation history
The administrative Judge for the Social Security Administration ruled that the place of death of Robert Capato was Florida. Under Florida law children can not inherit from a parent if they were conceived after that parent's death. The Social Security Administration has used state inheritance laws as the deciding factor if a person was a "child" under the Social Security Act and therefore eligible for survivors benefits since the 1940s. Capato appealed the Social Security Administration's decision and the case moved to the US Court of Appeals for the Third Circuit in Philadelphia, Pennsylvania. The appeals court reversed the Social Security Administration's decision.

Before the Court
Are children conceived by in vitro fertilization after their biological father's death protected under Title II of the Social Security Act?

Decision
In a unanimous 9–0 decision, Justice Ginsburg wrote the majority decision for the Supreme Court in favor of Astrue, stated that the children conceived after the death of their father were not entitled to Social Security benefits.

See also 
 List of United States Supreme Court cases, volume 566

References

Citations

Bibliography

External links
 

United States Supreme Court cases
2012 in United States case law
Social Security lawsuits
United States Supreme Court cases of the Roberts Court